They Had to See Paris is a 1929 American Pre-Code comedy film directed by Frank Borzage and starring Will Rogers, Irene Rich, and Marguerite Churchill. The screenplay concerns a wealthy American oil tycoon who travels to Paris with his family at his wife's request, despite the fact he hates the French.

Rogers starred in a similar film the following year, So This Is London with the location switched to London. Rogers and Rich reprised their roles in Down to Earth (1932) which depicts the return of the Peters family to Depression-hit America.

Cast
 Will Rogers as Pike Peters 
 Irene Rich as Mrs. Idy Peters 
 Owen Davis Jr. as Ross Peters 
 Marguerite Churchill as Opal Peters 
 Fifi D'Orsay as Fifi 
 Rex Bell as Clark McCurdy 
 Robert P. Kerr as Tupper 
 Ivan Lebedeff as Marquis de Brissac 
 Edgar Kennedy as Ed Eggers 
 Marcelle Corday as Marquise De Brissac 
 General Lodijensky as Grand Duke Mikhail
 André Cheron as Valet 
 Gregory Gaye as Prince Ordinsky
 Marcia Manon as Miss Mason (uncredited)

References

External links

1929 films
1929 comedy films
American comedy films
1920s English-language films
Films directed by Frank Borzage
Fox Film films
Films produced by William Fox
Films set in Paris
American black-and-white films
1920s American films